Begusarai is a soap opera that aired on &TV. The show premiered on 2 March 2015 and ended on 24 June 2016. It starred Shivangi Joshi, Vishal Aditya Singh, Shweta Tiwari, and Sartaj Gill in lead roles.The show is set in Begusarai, Bihar. The show was produced by Swastik Pictures (Swastik Productions Pvt. Ltd.).

Plot
Intelligent, Poonam Kumari dreams of higher studies. Her childhood Best - friend Priyom is the son of Begusarai's Bahubali Phulan Thakur, whose nephew Lakhan has loved Poonam since childhood. Phulan sets her marriage with Lakhan who starts torturing Poonam. Breaking the alliance, Phulan fixes Poonam's wedding to Priyom and they fall in love. Lakhan wreaks havoc on Begusarai and Thakur family. Poonam decides to marry him, so he will leave Thakur family alone.

Bindiya, a dancer enters Begusarai to make money by dancing in events. She wants to ruin the Thakurs as her father was the former king of Begusarai whom Phulan killed, bringing Bindiya and her mother on road, and thus becoming the king himself. Once Lakhan and Poonam marry, he again tortures her. Poonam learns about Lakhan's love for her and how he never hurt anyone when trying to woo her; she starts to like and turns him into a soft person, and they get close.

Priyom constantly gets mad at Bindiya's antics and tries to change her. Guddi is pregnant with the child of Poonam's brother, who dies in an accident. For this, Poonam blames Lakhan, and they get separated. Bindiya and Priyom fall in love; he becomes the Bahubali of Begusarai. Priyom tries to stop Mithilesh from killing a cheater business partner, but ends up being collateral and dies by his hands. Bindiya swears vengeance on Mithilesh. The entire family opposes her, except for Poonam and Lakhan. When she decides to file a case against Mithilesh but loses when Badi Amma (Sulbha Arya) locks Poonam in the supply closet. Datta Ji gets out of jail and comes back into the Thakur Haveli. He strips Bindiya in front of the entire Begusarai and drowns her alive. Lakhan and Poonam try to save her but are not able to. He also tries to kill Guddi and her child, but Poonam and Lakhan save her.

Poonam and Lakhan finally reveal their feelings for each other and start a new relationship. Bindiya is revealed to be alive and comes back to get revenge against the entire Thakur family for not coming to save her. She gives mercy to Lakhan and Poonam but tortures the rest of the family members and even kills Datta Ji. Choti Amma's granddaughter, Komal (Rati Pandey), comes to visit her while Bindiya becomes the Bahubali of Begusarai. Komal starts to fall in love with Lakhan and starts to help Bindiya financially by bringing her a Sarkar business partner. Sarkar demands a lot of Bindiya, which causes Guddi to lose her child and Lakhan and Poonam almost to get a divorce. The Thakur family goes against Bindiya and Komal and try to figure out who Sarkar is. Sarkar is revealed to be Choti Amma (Madhvi Gokhte), who wants revenge on the Thakur family and brought Komal to Thakur Family. In a chase between Komal and Choti Amma and Lakhan and Mithilesh, Komal's car falls off a cliff, and Choti Amma and Komal die. Bindiya is revealed to be pregnant with Priyom's child.

A couple of months later, Poonam and Mithilesh's wife, Maya (Vaishnavi Dhanraj), have also become pregnant. When all three daughters-in-law celebrate their baby shower and do puja by the river, Guddi is pulled into the water. Everyone looks for her, but not in time, and they find her dead body. It is revealed that Komal is alive and killed Guddi. Komal then kidnaps Mithilesh and Poonam's father in demand that Poonam leaves Lakhan. Mithilesh and Poonam's father tries to run away, but Poonam's father dies in the ensuing chase. Poonam decides to surrender herself for the safety of the Thakur family. Lakhan finds Poonam and Komal and shoots Komal in the chest. Poonam falls unconscious, and Lakhan takes her to the hospital. At the hospital, some goons kidnap Poonam, and it is revealed that Komal was saved after she got shot. Komal shoots Mithilesh and Lakhan, and Poonam dies during childbirth. Bindiya takes the baby and decides to raise him as her own.

20 years later

Twenty years later, Bindiya has become Ma Thakurain and takes care of Mithilesh and Maya's children, Soni (Riya Deepsi), Adarsh (Manish Naggdev), Amar (Parichay Sharma), and Samar (Mukul Raj Singh), her and Priyom's son, Garv (Ankit Gupta), and Poonam and Lakhan's son, Shakti (also Vishal Aditya Singh), who looks like Lakhan. Bindiya hates women because of what Komal did to the family. The entire family is scared of her and never do anything she does not like. All the boys are like goons and do everything for Bindiya. Everyone calls her mom, and Maya gets jealous that her kids do not consider her their real mother. The show then brings in Ananya Mishra (Vibha Anand), the daughter of Ramakant Mishra, a constable who is transferred to Begusarai. Ananya has an older good-for-nothing brother named Mayank (Mithli Jain), who is online chatting with Soni.

Ananya and Shakti first meet when Shakthi saves Ramakant from some goons. He asks for money, but since she has none, he takes her late mother's necklace. She gets it back but also learns he is petrified of his mom. They have funny interactions going on. Mayank and Soni meet secretly, but someone sees them and tells Ma Thakurain (Bindiya). She plans to get Soni married within three days. When Mayank hears of this, he tries to commit suicide. When Ananya finds out the reason behind the suicide, she decides to let Soni and Mayank meet for one last time. But Mayank cheats Ananya and runs away with Soni. When the five brothers find out Ananya helped Soni getting out, they kidnap her and torture them to find out where Soni and Mayank went.

When Ananya gets free, through the help of the police, the police arrest Ma Thakurain and the brothers decide to get revenge. Ma Thakurain gets out of jail, and Soni and Mayank return to Badi Haveli. Ma Thakurain decides to allow Soni and Mayank's marriage, but they live in their house on Mayank's condition. She asks Shakti to make Ananya fall in love with him, and then she will marry all of her sons. Ananya falls in love with Shakti, and Bindiya manages to get her married to all of the sons without interference. When Ananya learns the truth of her sham marriage, she decides to take revenge on the Thakur family and change them for the better. She does not let herself have any relations with the brothers and learns the oldest, Adarsh, is secretly married and is about to have his child.

She can get Adarsh's wife her rights in the house, and Shakthi falls in love with Ananya. Bindiya changes back into her former self when Badi Amma tells her she acted precisely like Datta Ji. Ananya talks to Bindiya and then asks her if she can leave. Shakthi asks her to stay, but she says her trust was broken, and she cannot stay. A few months later, Ananya is shown to be a teacher at a school, and Shakti shows up. He asks her to forgive him and marry him for real, and she finally forgives him. The show ends on a happy note, with Ananya forgiving Shakti.

Cast

Main
 Vishal Aditya Singh as Lakhan Bhushan Thakur (2015–2016)/Shakti Lakhan Thakur : Poonam's Husband; Priyom's Cousin; Shakti's Father/Ananya's Husband; Poonam and Lakhan's Son (2016)
 Shivangi Joshi as  Poonam Lakhan Thakur/Poonam Kumari Mahendra Jadhav : Priyom's ex Fiance and Childhood Best-friend ; Lakhan's Wife and Shakti's Mother. (2015–2016)
 Sarrtaj Gill as Priyom Phulan Thakur : Poonam's Ex- Fiance and Childhood Best-Friend; Bindiya's Husband and Garv's Father. (2015)
 Shweta Tiwari as Bindiya Priyom Thakur/Maa Thakurain : Priyom's Wife and Garv's Mother (2015–2016)
 Veebha Anand as Ananya Ramakant Mishra/Ananya Thakur : Shakti's Wife (2016)

Recurring 

 Ankit Gupta as Garv Priyom Thakur : Shakti's Cousin; Priyom and Bindiya's Son.(2016)
 Narendra Jha as Phulan Manohar Thakur (2015–2016)
 Vaishnavi Dhanraj/Kanishka Soni as Maya Mithilesh Thakur (2015–2016)/(2016)
 Darshan Dave as Mithilesh Phulan Thakur (2015–2016)
 Harshh Sethi as Bhushan Manohar Thakur (2015–2016) 
 Malini Sengupta as Rekha Bhushan Thakur (2015–2016)
 Riya Deepsi as Soni Mithilesh Thakur (2016)
 Richa Mukherjee as Gauri "Guddi" Phulan Thakur (2015–2016)
 Abhimanyyu Raj Singh as Ramakant Mishra (2016)
 Parichay Sharma as Amar Mithilesh Thakur (2016)
 Manish Naggdev as Adarsh Mithilesh Thakur (2016)
 Mukul Raj Singh as Samar Mithilesh Thakur (2016)
 Aalisha Panwar as Najma Akhtar Khan (2015)
 Sulbha Arya as Nandita Devi Manohar Thakur/Badi Amma (2015–2016)
 Aru Krishansh Verma as Rajkumar Phulan Thakur
 Sudesh Berry as Manohar Rajacharan Thakur/Dadaji (2015)
 Saptrishi Ghosh as SP K N Rai
 Mithli Jain as Mayank Ramakant Mishra
 Madhavi Gokhte as Choti Amma
 Nikhil Mehta as Dalbir "Dolt" Kumar Mahendra Jadhav (2015)
 Ankit Mohan as SP Avinash Srivastav (2015)
 Dheeraj Miglani as Ghungroo
 Vineet Raina as Bhanu (2015)
 Nandini Singh as Shravani

References

External links
 

Hindi-language television shows
2015 Indian television series debuts
2016 Indian television series endings
Indian drama television series
&TV original programming
Television shows set in Bihar
Swastik Productions television series